Samos International Airport (also known as Aristarchos)  is an airport on Samos Island, Greece.

The airport is named after Aristarchos of Samos, an ancient astronomer and mathematician, and lies within 5 km from the nearby town of Pythagorio. The airport features a single short runway serving both arrivals and departures. The airports surroundings leave little room for error or mistake on the behalf of the pilots – with nearby mountains and sea at the end of the short runway. There are often strong Meltemi winds blowing from the north during the summer months which further contribute to the difficulty of the landing.
There is only one terminal in the airport. There are five boarding gates, none of which have jet-bridges. Passenger facilities are split across two floors and include a duty-free shop and a small café.

History
The airport first operated in May 1976 and during the late 1990s/early 2000s, the terminal was renovated – the capacity of the airport was increased to deal with increasing passenger numbers and the terminal was renovated.

In December 2015, the privatisation of Samos International Airport and 13 other regional airports of Greece was finalised with the signing of the agreement between the Fraport AG/Copelouzos Group joint venture and the state privatisation fund. "We signed the deal today," the head of Greece's privatisation agency HRADF, Stergios Pitsiorlas, told Reuters. According to the agreement, the joint venture will operate the 14 airports (including Samos International Airport) for 40 years as of 11 April 2017.

Future investment
On 22 March 2017, Fraport Greece presented its master plan for the 14 regional airports including the International Airport of Samos.

The following summarizes the enhancement changes that will be started in October 2017 and will be implemented for Samos International Airport under Fraport Greece's investment plan until 2021:

 General clean-up
 Improving lighting, marking of airside areas.
 Upgrading sanitary facilities
 Enhancing services and offering a new free Internet connection (WiFi)
 Implementing works to improve fire safety in all the areas of the airports
 Expanding and remodeling the current terminal 
 New fire station
 Reorganizing the airport apron area
 19 percent increase in the total size of the terminal at 9,605m2
 40 percent increase in the number of check-in counters (from 10 to 14)
 25 percent increase in the number of departure gates (from 4 to 5)
 50 percent increase in the number of security lanes (from 2 to 3)

Airlines and destinations

The following airlines operate regular scheduled and charter flights at Samos Airport:

Traffic figures 

The data are from Hellenic Civil Aviation Authority (CAA) until 2016, and data from 2017 and later are from the official website of the airport.

Traffic statistics by country (2022)

Accidents and incidents 
 On 3 August 1989, Olympic Aviation Flight 545 crashed into Mount Kerkis while on approach to Samos Airport. All 31 passengers and all three crew members died in the accident.

See also
Transport in Greece

References

Airports in Greece